Afro-Argentines are people in Argentina of primarily Sub-Saharan African descent. The Afro-Argentine population is the result of people being brought over during the transatlantic slave trade during the centuries of Spanish domination in the region and immigration  from Africa. 

During the 18th and 19th centuries they accounted for up to fifty percent of the population in certain cities, and had a deep impact on Argentine culture. Some old theories held it that in the 19th century the Afro-Argentine population declined sharply due to several factors, such as the Argentine War of Independence (c. 1810–1818), high infant mortality rates, low numbers of married couples who were both Afro-Argentine, the War of the Triple Alliance, cholera epidemics in 1861 and 1864 and a yellow fever epidemic in 1871.

Research in recent decades cites a strong racial intermixing with whites and amerindians in the 18th and 19th centuries as the main reason for the decline of the black population in Argentina. That mixing was promoted by governments of those times as a method to, in a first era, make non-whites (amerindians and blacks) racially closer to whites to construct what was seen by the elite as a modern society; and in a second era, make them decline gradually through their "dilution" into a white majority that it was to become as such with the promotion of a mass immigration from Europe and Middle East that started to arrive since then (mid-19th century) until the 1940s. At the same time, non-whites frequently sought to have offspring with whites as a way to make their racially mixed child escape from slavery in the colonial period, and later, from discrimination.

Importation of African slaves during colonial period

As part of the process of conquest, the economic regimes of the European colonies in the Americas developed various forms of forced labor exploitation of the indigenous peoples. However, the relatively low population density of some of the South American territories, resistance by some aboriginal groups to acculturation, and especially the high rate of mortality caused by the diseases introduced by Europeans caused the decline of the native population. Studies have shown that owing to their immunological isolation from the peoples of the Old World prior to the first contacts with Europeans from 1492 onwards, some 50-90% of the indigenous population throughout the Americas died from epidemic diseases, exacerbated by the stresses brought on by violent conquest, dispossession and exploitation. This led the Spaniards to supplement aboriginal manpower with slaves from West and Central Africa.

Well into the 19th century, mining and agriculture accounted for the bulk of economic activity in the Americas. African slave labor held the advantage of having already been exposed to European diseases through geographical proximity, and African laborers readily adapted to the tropical climate of the colonies. In the case of Argentina, the influx of African slaves began in the colonies of the Rio de la Plata in 1588. European slave traders purchased African slaves, who were then shipped from West Africa across the Atlantic to the Americas and the Caribbean. The slave trade flourished through the port of Buenos Aires, where thousands of African slaves arrived to be sold. To provide slaves to the East Indies, the Spanish crown granted contracts known as Asientos to various slave trading companies, both from Spain and other European nations.

Before the 16th century slaves had arrived in relatively small numbers from the Cape Verde islands. Thereafter the majority of Africans brought to Argentina were from ethnic groups speaking Bantu languages, from the territories now comprising Angola, the Democratic Republic of the Congo and the Republic of the Congo. Relatively few Yoruba and Ewe were taken to Argentina; larger numbers of these groups were taken to Brazil.

It is estimated that 12 million African slaves reached Latin America, with many transported via slave ships to other regions through Valparaíso and Rio de Janeiro. An estimated 10-15% of slaves died during passage across the Atlantic. However, many more died during the process of enslavement, travel through the interior of Africa, and while awaiting shipment, with an estimated 40 deaths for every 100 slaves who reached the New World.

The slaves were forced to work in agriculture, livestock, domestic work and to a lesser extent crafts. In urban areas, many slaves made handicrafts for sale, while revenues went to their masters. The Buenos Aires neighborhood of San Telmo and Monserrat housed a large quantity of slaves, although most were sent to the interior provinces. The 1778 census conducted by Juan José Salcedo of Vértiz showed very high concentration of blacks (though largely the product of varying degrees of racial mixing with whites and amerindians) in cities located in regions where agricultural production was greatest: 54% in Santiago del Estero, 52% in San Fernando del Valle de Catamarca, 46% in Salta, 44% in Córdoba, 44% in San Miguel de Tucumán, 24% in Mendoza, 20% in La Rioja, 16% in San Juan, 13% in San Salvador de Jujuy and 9% in San Luis, although there were some more in other cities and towns that were small percentages there. For example, one of the currently rich neighbourhoods of the city of Corrientes is still known as "Camba Cuá", from the Guarani kamba kua, meaning "cave of the blacks".

Black people in the independence and early history of Argentina

In 1801 the first Afro-Argentine militias were organised, under the auspices of the Compañía de Granaderos de Pardos libres de Buenos Aires and Compañía de Granaderos de Morenos libres de Buenos Aires. The pardos were free people of mixed European, African, and Native American, particularly Guaraní, descent, whereas the "morenos" seem to have been composed of soldiers of largely African ancestry. These forces were unified into the Batallón de Pardos y Morenos, also known as the Batallón Castas, at a strength of 9 companies, plus 4 auxiliary slave companies, at the time of the first British invasion of the River Plate. Regimental status was gained in 1810, and the new Regimento de Pardos y Morenos participated in the Argentine War of Independence.

In 1812, Argentine politician Bernardo de Monteagudo was not allowed as a member of the First Triumvirate, due to his "questionable mother"—i.e., African ancestry. Bernardino Rivadavia, also of African descent, was one of the politicians who were barred from joining the triumvirate. The Assembly of the Year XIII, called to establish the new independent state of Argentina, passed the law of freedom of wombs, whereby children born to slaves thenceforth were automatically free citizens, but did not free those who were already slaves. Many blacks were part of militias and irregular troops that eventually became part of the Argentine Army, but mostly in segregated squadrons. Black slaves could, however, ask to be sold and even find a buyer if they were unhappy with their owners.

After the abolition of slavery, many blacks faced widespread discrimination. The fourteen schools in Buenos Aires in 1857, only admitted two black children, although 15% of students that year were of color. In Córdoba in 1829, black children were entitled to only two years' secondary schooling, while white Argentine children studied for four years. Universities did not admit blacks until 1853.

Blacks began to publish newspapers and to organize for their rights. One paper, The Unionist, published in 1877 a statement of equal rights and justice for all people regardless of skin color was published. One of its statements read:

Other newspapers were The African Race, the Black Democrat and The Proletarian, all published in 1858. By the 1880s there were about twenty such Argentine blacks published newspapers in Buenos Aires; and some researchers consider these social movements integral to the introduction of socialism and the idea of social justice in Argentine culture.

Some blacks entered politics. José María Morales and Domingo Sosa were in action as senior military officers and held significant political posts.

Decline of the Afro-Argentine population 

In the last decades, theories have been disputed over the causation of their decline. Older theories supported a genocide as the main factor in the reduction of their population. Among the causes expressed are the supposed high mortality of black soldiers in the wars of the 19th century (since theoretically, they were a disproportionately high number within the armed forces, which would have been intentionally planned by the governments of the time) and in a yellow fever epidemic in 1871 that affected the south of the city of Buenos Aires, as well as a large emigration to Uruguay (due to the fact that there would have been a larger black population and a more favorable political climate).

Research in recent decades has ruled out such theories. Although it is true that blacks made up an important part of the armies and militias of the 19th century, they were not the majority nor did their number differ much from that of Amerindians and whites, even in the lower ranks (the so-called cannon fodder). Nor did the yellow fever epidemics that affected Buenos Aires (especially the most lethal, which was that of 1871) have a big effect, since demographic studies do not support that view (on the contrary, they show that the most affected were recent European immigrants living in poverty) and, furthermore, this theory does not explain the decline of the black population in the rest of Argentina.

The most widely accepted theory today is that the black population gradually decreased over the generations due to its mixture with whites and, to a lesser extent, Amerindians, which occurred frequently since the 18th century in the colonial period, and that it accelerated even more in the late 19th century (in the already independent Argentina) with the arrival of the massive immigration wave from Europe and Middle East, which was promoted by the Argentine governments of the time precisely so that the non-white population becomes "diluted" within the white majority through racial mixture. This process was similar to that of the rest of the continent (with different results depending on the volume of immigration and the particular demographic characteristics of each region) and is known as whitening.

This was based on the falsehood that whites (especially those belonging to Western European cultures) were the only ones capable of carrying on a civilization, while most non-whites (such as Amerindians and Blacks) were inevitably related to barbarism.

However, unlike other regions of the Americas where there was a strong violent segregation of non-whites in an attempt to prevent racial mixing, Argentine elite thought that non-white offspring could be improved if were the result of a mix with whites. The exception, since mid-19h century, were those non-whites that still lived in tribal societies that were not part of the Argentine culture and weren't under the control of the government, in this case, Amerindians from several local indigenous peoples that usually had conflicts with it (other ones, on the other hand, were becoming assimilated to the country's society), thus seen as incorrigible savages that were a block to the progress and a threat to the nation. This led to wars against them (like the Conquest of the Desert) that in some cases ended with genocides or mass murders, also taking their lands.

In late colonial times the racial mixture was common because, despite the racism prevailing at the time, the level of segregation and violence towards non-whites who were part of colonial society in the territories that are currently part of Argentina, was less than that which existed in other European colonies in the Americas and other Spanish colonial regions where a greater intensity of slave labor was required (such as mining enclaves or agricultural large estates in tropical regions). For this reason, there was less mistreatment towards slaves, who also had greater freedom to circulate, especially those who worked in the fields, where labor associated with livestock and extensive farming was fundamentally required. It was also more common for them to be able to buy their freedom, so even several decades before the abolition of slavery, it was in clear decline.

On the other hand, due to the association of blackness with barbarism, already at the last decades of the 18th century, blacks (who by then normally had a certain level of racial mixture and therefore lighter skin than most of slaves recently arrived from Africa, as well as less typical features of the race), according to their degree of freedom or good relationship with their masters or white social environment, gradually came to be considered in censuses and legal documents in ambiguous pseudo-racial categories (but beneficial for them) such as those of pardos and trigueños (which also included amerindians who were part of colonial society and even whites with a high level of racial mixture) in an attempt to detach them from their slave past and, theorically, make them more functional to the modern society that the authorities intended to conform (according to their eurocentrist vision), and this allowed those already mixed blacks a better social position and a greater degree of freedom by moving away from their original racial category. In other cases, also due to their ambiguous phenotype, several tried to be recorded as Indians (if they could explain their indigenous ancestry) because this would allow them to obtain freedom, since from the 16th century, in Spanish colonies it was prohibited the slavery of indigenous peoples of the Americas through the New Laws and the Laws of the Indies (despite this, it happened illegally, but much less frequently than the slavery of black Africans and their descendants, which was permitted). There were even cases of black women with a high degree of racial mixture who managed to be noted as señoras or doñas (categories reserved only for white women) with the help of white people from their environment (for example, couples).

These situations made blacks prefer to form families with whites and Amerindians in order to have children who had lighter skin and features more distant from the natives of Sub-Saharan Africa, which increased their level of racial mixture and, therefore, decline, which lasted strongly even after the abolition of slavery, since people with lighter skin continued to rule society and make up the majority of the elite, thus leaving dark skin associated with poverty in the Argentine idiosyncrasy.

The classification of an increasing number of non-whites (especially those who had at least some racial mixture) into new ambiguous pseudo-racial categories was devised by authorities since the last years of the colonial period as a method to move them from their original racial identities (negros and indios) in an attempt to make them more assimilable within the modern society that was sought to create. This was a first part of the whitening, known as the lightening, in which non-whites were put gradually into categories that were closer to the white one, that was the more desirable. Also, the white elite, which was a minority in most places until the mid-19th century, used this as a way to make a difference between "us" and "them", allowing many people to "leave" their undesirable original categories, but at the same time preventing them to become labeled as whites (since in certain cases they presented an aspect closer to the white than that of the Amerindian or Black) to deny them the access to the power and privileges reserved for a minority.

In this way, terms such as morochos or criollos (which expanded its original colonial meaning, that was referred only to Spanish-descent whites born in the Americas) came to be used to catalog the vast majority of the population that was not clearly white (or whites descendants of Spanish from the colonial period in the case of criollos), helping later the narrative of the disappearance of Amerindians and Blacks in the country. The very people belonging to these races (which were already heavily racially mixed, especially in the case of blacks) actively sought to identify with the new categories since they were symbolically closer to whiteness, which made possible more benefits and less discrimination. Only blacks with dark skin were considered as such, and being a minority even within the Argentine black population itself, they were considered as isolated cases or foreigners (since, from the late 19th century, several of them were free African immigrants who arrived recently mainly from Cape Verde). In the case of Amerindians, only those who were part of the indigenous peoples that still survived (who represented a small minority) came to be considered as such, but not those who were part of the majoritarian non-indigenous Argentine society.

In 1887 the official percentage of the black population was computed at 1.8% of the total. From that moment on, racial categories were not registered in the censuses. The position of the State became explicit again when the National Census of 1895 was carried out when those responsible stated:

In reference to the racial mixture that had occurred with blacks for several generations, in 1905 the journalist Juan José de Soiza Reilly stated in his article Gente de color (published in the magazine Caras y Caretas) that:

From then on, and for almost a century, in Argentina practically no studies were carried out on black Argentines.

Present

Today in Argentina, the Afro-Argentine community is beginning to emerge from the shadows. There have been black organizations such as "Grupo Cultural Afro," "SOS Racismo," and perhaps the most important group "Africa Vive", founded by Pocha Lamadrid, that help to rekindle interest into the African heritage of Argentina. There are also Afro-Uruguayan and Afro-Brazilian migrants who have helped to expand the African culture. Afro-Uruguayan migrants have brought candombe to Argentina, while Afro-Brazilians teach capoeira, orisha, and other African derived secula. It has been well over a century since Argentina has reflected the African racial ancestry in its census count. Therefore, calculating the exact number of Afro-descendants is very difficult; however, Africa Vive calculates that there are about 1,000,000 partially Afro-descendants in Argentina. The last census, carried on 27 October 2010, introduced the African ancestry survey. Still, as in other Latin American nations, Argentines of Black African background may not always identify as Afro-Argentine, due to the pervasive negative connotations associated to blackness and the lack of historical records for black bloodlines in Argentina.

The Forum of African Descent and Africans in Argentina was created on 9 October 2006, with the aim of promoting social and cultural pluralism and the fight against discrimination of a population in the country to reach the two million inhabitants.

Since 2013, November 8 has been celebrated as the National Day of Afro-Argentines and African Culture. The date was chosen to commemorate the recorded date for the death of María Remedios del Valle, a rabona and guerrilla fighter, who served with the Army of the North in the war of Independence.

The National Institute Against Discrimination (INADI) is the public body responsible for combating discrimination and racism. In 2021, the Argentine government announced the establishment of a "Afro-Argentine Community Federal Advisor Council", made up of prominent Afro-Argentine activists and scholars.

African influence in Argentine culture

Music

Candombe

The seeds of candombe originated in present-day Angola, where it was taken to South America during the 17th and 18th centuries by people who had been sold as slaves in the kingdom of Kongo, Anziqua, Nyong, Quang and others, mainly by Portuguese slave traders. The same cultural carriers of candombe colonized Brazil (especially in the area of Salvador de Bahia), Cuba, and the Río de la Plata with its capital Buenos Aires and Montevideo. The different histories and experiences in these regions branched out from the common origin, giving rise to different rhythms.

In Buenos Aires, during the two governments of Juan Manuel de Rosas, it was common for “afroporteños” (black people of Buenos Aires) to perform candombe in public, even encouraged and visited by Rosas and his daughter, Manuela. Rosas was defeated at the battle of Caseros in 1852, and Buenos Aires began a profound and rapid cultural shift which saw a bigger emphasis on European culture. In this context, afroporteños replicated their ancestral cultural patterns increasingly into their private life. For this reason, onwards from 1862, the press, intellectuals and politicians began to assert the  misconception of Afro-Argentine disappearance that has remained in the imagination of ordinary people from Argentina.

Many researchers agree that the Candombe, through the development of the milonga, is an essential component in the genesis of Argentine tango. This musical rhythm influenced, especially the "Sureña Milonga". In fact, tango, milonga and candombe form a musical triptych from the same African roots, but with different developments.

Initially, the practice of Candombe was practiced exclusively by black people, who had designed special places called “Tangós”. This word originated sometime in the 19th century the word "Tango", but at that time not yet with its present meaning. Today, candombe is still practiced by Afro-Argentine and non-black populations across Argentina. In Corrientes Province, candombe is part of the religious feast of San Baltasar, a folk patron saint for Black Argentines.

Tango
Perhaps the most lasting effect of Black influence in Argentina was the tango, which contains and continues some of the features of the tangos, meetings in which slaves assembled to sing and dance. The modern term for a tango ball, milonga, has its roots in the Quimbanda language of Angola, and a large Afro-Argentine and Afro-Uruguayan contribution is also evident in the development of milonga and chacarera music. The song tradition of the payadores was also associated with Afro-Argentines, with some scholars, for example George Reid Andrews, arguing that it originated among the Afro-Argentine community, while others, such as Sylvain B. Poosson, view it as a continuation of the Andalusian traditions like the trovo. Whatever their origin, payadas provided an opportunity for Black singers like Gabino Ezeiza to use music to articulate political consciousness and defend their right to exist within Argentina's increasingly white-dominated society.

Murga
Argentine murga has considerable influence from candombe and other African musical influences. Murga porteña places a considerable emphasis on dance and instrumentals, more so than lyrics (in contrast to Uruguayan murga). Performances take place in the form of parades (known as corsos) across the various neighbourhoods of Buenos Aires; some groups feature not only dancers and musicians but also jugglers, stilts, flagbearers, and other types of visually stimulating elements. Corsos take place throughout the year, but are recurrent during carnival season in February.

Demographics
According to the Argentine national census of 2010, the total population of Argentines was 40,117,096, of whom 149,493 (0.37%) identified as Afro-Argentine, although according to gene pools studies, the Argentine population with some degree of Sub-Saharan African descent would be around 7.5%. World Bank and Argentine government estimates have suggested the Argentine population with significant African ancestry could number over 2 million.

Despite the fact that in the 1960s it was calculated that Argentina owed two thirds of the volume of its population to European immigration, over 5% of Argentines state they have at least one black ancestor, and a further 20% state they do not know whether or not they have any black ancestors. Genetic studies carried out in 2005 showed that the average level of African genetic contribution in the population of Buenos Aires is 2.2%, but that this component is concentrated in 10% of the population who display notably higher levels of African ancestry. Today there is still a notable Afro-Argentine community in the Buenos Aires districts of San Telmo and La Boca. There are also quite a few African-descended Argentines in Merlo and Ciudad Evita cities, in the Buenos Aires metropolitan area.

Immigrants from Cape Verde

 
Between 12,000 and 15,000 descendants of immigrants from Cape Verde living in Argentina, of whom about 300 are native to the African continent.

This immigration began in the late 19th century and became important from the 1920s. The busiest periods were between 1927 and 1933 and the third, after 1946. These migrations were mainly due to droughts in the African country that originated famine and death.

They were expert sailors and fishermen, which is why most places settled in ports such as Rosario, Buenos Aires, San Nicolás, Bahía Blanca, Ensenada and Dock Sud. 95% of them got jobs in the Military Navy, in the Merchant Navy in the Fluvial Fleet of Argentina and in YPF dockyards or the ELMA.

Other immigrants from Africa

In Buenos Aires

In the popularly called Barrio del Once there are Africans who have come to escape the conditions of their countries, particularly Senegal. According to the Agency for Refugees in Buenos Aires, they came by seeking asylum or getting a visa to travel to Brazil and then Argentina, sometimes traveling as stowaways on ships. When denied a residence permit, the African refugees remain in the country without status and become lawful targets of human trafficking network. On Sunday some of the Senegalese community comes together to eat traditional dishes of their country. Some places already have African food recipes.

In Rosario
Since 2004 some Africans emigrated from their home countries and stowed away to Argentina, particularly the port of Rosario, Santa Fe. Although figures are inadequate the numbers increase every year: in 2008 70 refugees arrived, after some 40 the previous year; only 10 remained, the rest were repatriated. Many were children.

They usually get on ships without knowing where they go, or believing they are going to a developed country in the northern hemisphere. They come from Nigeria, Côte d'Ivoire and Guinea.

Racism in Argentina related to skin tone

In Argentina, as in other countries of the Americas, racism related to skin tone dates back to the days of colonial rule. In the caste system imposed by Spain, the descendants of people from Black Africa occupied a place still lower than the descendants of people belonging to aboriginal peoples.

Colonial racism passed into Argentine culture to a certain extent, as shown by certain phrases included in the national literature. Disputes with a racist tinge were depicted in a famous passage from José Hernández's book, Martín Fierro (La ida), published in 1870, in which the main character duels with a black gaucho after insulting his girlfriend and insulting him with the following verse:

Notable Afro-Argentines

Military

 María Remedios del Valle (ca. 1768–1847), senior master sergeant in the War of Independence and "Mother of the Homeland"
 Domingo Sosa (1788–1866), colonel in the War of Independence and the Civil Wars
 Juan Bautista Cabral (1789–1813), private in the War of Independence and national hero
 Antonio Ruiz (died 1810), soldier in the War of Independence and national hero
 Lorenzo Barcala (1793–1835), lieutenant colonel in the Civil Wars
 Celestino Barcala (died 1867), major in the Argentine Civil Wars
 José María Morales (1818–1894), colonel in the Civil Wars and the War of the Triple Alliance and legislator 
 Manuel G. Posadas (1841–1897), musician, journalist, and sergeant in the War of the Triple Alliance

Politics

 Bernardino Rivadavia (1780–1845), first president of Argentina
 Bernardo de Monteagudo (1789–1825), independence leader and deputy of the Assembly of the Year XIII
 Tomás Platero IV (1857–1925), writer, poet and co-founder of the Radical Civic Union
 Ramón Carrillo (1906–1956), neurosurgeon and first Health Minister of Argentina
 Pocha Lamadrid (1945–2021), activist and founder of África Vive
 María Fernanda Silva (born 1965), diplomat and ambassador
 David Leiva (born 1980), member of the Salta Chamber of Deputies and former city councillor

Music and literature

 Casimiro Alcorta (1840–1913), tango violinist, dancer and songwriter
 Zenón Rolón (1856–1902), composer
 Gabino Ezeiza (1858–1916), payador, singer-songwriter, and pioneer of the tango
 Manuel Posadas (1860–1916), tango composer
 Higinio Cazón (1866–1914), payador and tango composer
 Rosendo Mendizábal (1868–1913), tango composer
 Carlos Posadas (1874–1918), tango composer
 Cayetano Alberto Silva (1868–1920), composer of the March of San Lorenzo
 Enrique Maciel (1897–1962), guitarist, bandoneonist and composer
 Oscar Alemán (1909–1980), jazz composer and dancer
 Horacio Salgán (1916–2016), tango singer-songwriter
 La Mona Jiménez (born 1951), cuarteto singer-songwriter
 Carlos García López (1958–2014), rock guitarist
 Fidel Nadal (born 1965), reggae singer-songwriter
 Emanuel Ntaka (born 1977), pop singer
 Joy Villa (born 1986), pop singer

TV and film

 José A. Ferreyra (1889–1943), director, screenwriter and producer
 Rita Montero (1928–2013), stage, TV and film actress and singer
 Diego Alonso Gómez (born 1972), TV and film actor
 Marcos Martínez (born 1977), TV and film actor and comedian

Sports
Alejandro de los Santos (1902–1982), footballer
 Arturo Rodríguez (1907–1982), boxer
 Guillermo Lovell (1912–1966), boxer
 Santiago Lovell (1918–1967), boxer
 Miguel Montuori (1932–1998) footballer
 José Ramos Delgado (1935–2010), footballer
 Héctor Baley (born 1950), footballer
 Wilson Severino (born 1980), footballer
 Clemente Rodríguez (born 1981), footballer
 Fernando Tissone (born 1986), footballer
 Cristian Tissone (born 1988), footballer
 Sthefany Thomas (born 1989), basketball player
 Matías Presentado (born 1992), footballer
 James Parker (born 1994), handball player
 Joana Bolling (born 1995), handball player
 Erik Thomas (born 1995), basketball player
 Cristian Medina (born 2002), footballer

Other
 Felipa Larrea (1810–1910), last surviving former slave
 Antonio Gonzaga (born 1875), chef and cookbook writer

Gallery

See also

Candombe
Tango
Milonga (music)
Chacarera
Afro-Latin American
Argentine people
African immigration to Latin America
Demographics of Argentina
Immigration to Argentina
Angolan Argentine
Cape Verdean Argentines
Ethnic groups of Argentina

Further reading
 Andrews, George Reid. 1980. The Afro-Argentines of Buenos Aires, 1800-1900, Madison: University of Wisconsin Press. 
 Edwards, Erika Denise. 2020. Hiding in Plain Sight: Black Women, the Law and the Making of a White Argentine Republic, Tuscaloosa: University of Alabama Press.

References

External links

ARGENTINA: Drumming Up Black Awareness
In Buenos Aires, Researchers Exhume Long-Unclaimed African Roots
Blacks in Argentina -- officially a few, but maybe a million

 
Ethnic groups in Argentina
People of African descent